Sapperton Tunnel may refer to:

 Sapperton Canal Tunnel, Gloucestershire, England
 Sapperton Railway Tunnel, Gloucestershire, England